Yevgeni Igorevich Latyshonok (born 21 June 1998) is a Russian football player. He plays for FC Baltika Kaliningrad.

Club career
He made his debut in the Russian Professional Football League for FC Krasnodar-2 on 5 April 2017 in a game against FC Chayka Peschanokopskoye.

On 23 July 2019, he joined FC Baltika Kaliningrad. He made his Russian Football National League debut for Baltika on 10 August 2019 in a game against FC Mordovia Saransk.

References

External links
 
 Profile by Russian Professional Football League

1998 births
People from Giaginsky District
Sportspeople from Adygea
Living people
Russian footballers
Russia youth international footballers
Association football goalkeepers
FC Krasnodar-2 players
FC Baltika Kaliningrad players
Russian First League players
Russian Second League players